Lyman Spencer "Pop" Perry (March 10, 1897 – June 2, 1975) was an American football player and naval officer.  He played college football for the Navy Midshipmen football team of the United States Naval Academy.  After the 1918 season, he was selected as a consensus first-team guard on the 1918 College Football All-America Team.  

Perry served in the United States Navy from graduation until January 1946, attaining the rank of commodore. He was also served as athletic director at the Naval Academy from 1942 to 1943.  He died in 1975 in Easton, Maryland.  He was buried at the United States Naval Academy Cemetery in Annapolis.

References

1897 births
1975 deaths
All-American college football players
American football guards
Navy Midshipmen football players
Players of American football from Ohio
People from Andover, Ohio
Burials at the United States Naval Academy Cemetery